Abū al-Faḍl al-Tamīmī (952–1020 CE/341–410 AH) Abd al-Wāḥid b. ʿAbd al-ʿAzīz b. al-Ḥārith b. Asad al-Tamīmī or  Abū al-Faḍl al-Tamīmī  was a 10th century Muslim saint who belonged to the Junaidia order.  He was the son and disciple of Abu al-Hasan al-Tamimi. He was an ardent worshipper and ascetic. Not many details about his early life are known except that his family was from Yemen. His family belonged to the Arabian al-Tamimi tribe. He followed the Hanafi school of thought.

Works 
Among his most celebrated works is I'tiqad al-Imam al-Mubajjal Ahmad ibn Hanbal (also known as I'tiqad al-Imam al-Munabbal Abi 'Abd Allah Ahmad ibn Hanbal).

Spiritual career
Abu Al Fazal Abdul Wahid Yemeni Tamimi is often associated with Abu Bakr Shibli, a sufi of Persian descent.  This is probably because he looked to Abu Bakr Shibli's teachings for guidance although he gave Bayatat (oath of allegiance) to his father Abdul Aziz bin Harith bin Asad al-Tamimi from whom he was given the Sufi khirqa (the initiatory cloak of the Sufi chain of spirituality). Muhaddith Shah Waliullah Dehlawi is reported to have said, “Abdul Wahid at-Tamimi wore the khirqa from both ‘Abdul Aziz al-Tamimi and Abu Bakr Shibli. This is reflected in many of the authentic chains of spiritual transmission.” Abu Al Fazal Abdul Wahid Yemeni Tamimi spent most of his life guiding people often while travelling . Amongst his various disciples, his prominent khalifah (successor) was Mohammad Yousaf Abu-al-Farrah Turtoosi.

Spiritual Lineage
Abu Al Fazal Abdul Wahid al-Tamimi's saintly lineage of Faqr was given to him through his father and Murshid Abdul Aziz bin Hars bin Asad al-Tamimi in the following order:
Muhammad
'Alī bin Abī Ṭālib
al-Ḥasan al-Baṣrī
Habib al Ajami
Dawud Tai
Maruf Karkhi
Sirri Saqti
Junaid Baghdadi, the founder of Junaidia silsila
Abu Bakr Shibli
ʿAbd al-ʿAzīz b. al-Ḥārith b. Asad al-Tamimi
Abū al-Faḍl al-Tamīmī

Abdul Wahid Tamimi conferred his khilafat (successor to Muhammad) to Mohammad Yousaf Abu al-Faraj Tarasusi who continued the order.

Titles
 Khādim-ush-Sharī’ah (Guardian of the Sacred Law)
 Sālik-ut-Tarīqah (Wayfarer of the Spiritual Path)
 Wāqif-ul-Haqīqah (Unveiler of Divine Mysteries)

Death
Abu Al Fazal Abdul Wahid Yemeni Tamimi died in 1020 CE. He was buried in the mausoleum of Imam Ahmad b. Hanbal in Baghdad.

See also

al-Tamimi
Abu al-Hasan al-Tamimi
Abu Bakr Shibli
Abu Saeed Mubarak Makhzoomi
List of Yemenis
List of famous Sufis
List of Sufi saints

References 

Hanbalis
Asharis
Kullabis
People from Baghdad
Yemeni Sufi saints
9th-century Yemeni people
9th-century Arabs
952 births
1034 deaths